Ta Khar Ta Yan Nite A Chit The Ei Tho Phit Tat The is a 2004 Burmese romantic drama film directed by Malikha Soe Htike Aung starring Dwe and Htet Htet Moe Oo. The film, produced by Malikha film production premiered in Myanmar on June 4, 2004.

Plot summary
It is about a girl who cannot forgot her first love and about a programmer who comes to Yangon.

Cast
Dwe
Htet Htet Moe Oo
Ye Aung

Release
It is started showing June 4, 2004 at Twin, Tamata, Mingalar in Yangon, Win Lite, Myo Ma in Mandalay.

References

2004 films
Burmese romantic drama films
2000s Burmese-language films
2004 romantic drama films